Hoegea distigma is a species of beetles in the family Cerambycidae, the only species in the genus Hoegea.

References

Trachyderini
Monotypic Cerambycidae genera